Novak Djokovic defeated the two-time defending champion Rafael Nadal in the final, 4–6, 6–3, 6–3 to win the men's singles tennis title at the 2014 Italian Open.

Seeds
The top eight seeds receive a bye into the second round.

 Rafael Nadal (final)
 Novak Djokovic (champion)
 Stan Wawrinka (third round)
 Roger Federer (second round)
 David Ferrer (quarterfinals)
 Tomáš Berdych (third round)
 Andy Murray (quarterfinals)
 Milos Raonic (semifinals)
 John Isner (first round)
 Kei Nishikori (withdrew because of a back injury)
 Jo-Wilfried Tsonga (third round)
 Grigor Dimitrov (semifinals)
 Fabio Fognini (first round)
 Mikhail Youzhny (third round)
 Tommy Haas (quarterfinals, retired)
 Tommy Robredo (second round)

Draw

Finals

Top half

Section 1

Section 2

Bottom half

Section 3

Section 4

Qualifying

Seeds

 Santiago Giraldo (qualified)
 Carlos Berlocq (first round)
 Albert Montañés (first round)
 Andrey Golubev (qualified)
 Pablo Carreño Busta (qualified)
 Alejandro Falla (qualifying competition, lucky loser) 
 Sam Querrey (qualifying competition)
 Daniel Gimeno Traver (first round)
 Jack Sock (first round)
 Łukasz Kubot (first round)
 Bernard Tomic (first round)
 Alejandro González (qualified)
 Dušan Lajović ''(Qualfifying competition)
 Stéphane Robert (qualified)

Qualifiers

  Santiago Giraldo
  Stéphane Robert
  Stefano Travaglia
  Andrey Golubev
  Pablo Carreño Busta
  Alejandro González
  Pere Riba

Lucky loser
  Alejandro Falla

First qualifier

Second qualifier

Third qualifier

Fourth qualifier

Fifth qualifier

Sixth qualifier

Seventh qualifier

References

Main Draw
Qualifying Draw

Italian Open - Singles
Men's Singles